Lyndsai Cowan (born 6 January 1949) is a Canadian figure skater. She competed in the ladies' singles event at the 1968 Winter Olympics.

References

1949 births
Living people
Canadian female single skaters
Olympic figure skaters of Canada
Figure skaters at the 1968 Winter Olympics
Figure skaters from Toronto